Arteurotia is a genus of skipper butterflies genus in the family Hesperiidae.

Species
Two species are recognised in the genus Arteurotia:
 Arteurotia celendris Hewitson, 1878
 Arteurotia tractipennis Butler & Druce, 1872 - starred skipper - Mexico, Costa Rica and Panama

References

Carcharodini
Hesperiidae genera
Monotypic butterfly genera